Rustem Rashitovich Kalimullin (born 24 June 1984) is a Russian former footballer of Tatar origin.

Club career
He transferred to Dynamo Bryansk after playing for FC Kuban Krasnodar in the first game of the 2011–12 season in the Russian Premier League.

External links

References

1984 births
Living people
Russian footballers
Russia under-21 international footballers
Russian expatriate footballers
Tatar people of Russia
PFC Spartak Nalchik players
Russian Premier League players
FC Kuban Krasnodar players
FC KAMAZ Naberezhnye Chelny players
FC Khimki players
Expatriate footballers in Armenia
Ulisses FC players
Association football forwards
FC Avangard Kursk players
FC Dynamo Bryansk players